A split-charge diode is an electronic device used to enable simultaneous charging of multiple batteries from one power source.  The device prevents current from flowing from one battery to another while enabling the batteries to be continuously connected.

While the original devices used diodes to charge the two batteries, while keeping them separate from each other, most devices now use other configurations in order to avoid the 0.7V drop which reduces efficiency and increases power dissipation. However the name still remains.

Diodes